The Treacherous Brothers is a 1690 tragedy by the English writer George Powell.

The original Drury Lane cast included George Powell as the King of Cyprus, John Verbruggen as Meleander, Joseph Williams as Ithocles, William Mountfort as Menaphon, John Hodgson as Orgillus, Elizabeth Boutell as Semanthe, Charlotte Butler as Statilia and Anne Bracegirdle as Marcelia.

References

Bibliography
 Van Lennep, W. The London Stage, 1660-1800: Volume One, 1660-1700. Southern Illinois University Press, 1960.
 Watson, George. The New Cambridge Bibliography of English Literature: Volume 2, 1660-1800. Cambridge University Press, 1971.

1690 plays
West End plays
Tragedy plays
Plays by George Powell